1-Ethynylcyclohexanol (ECX) is an alkynyl alcohol derivative which is both a synthetic precursor to, and an active metabolite of the tranquilizer ethinamate, and has similar sedative, anticonvulsant and muscle relaxant effects. It has been sold as a designer drug, first being identified in the UK in March 2012.

Preparation 

1-Ethynylcyclohexanol can be prepared from cyclohexanone by the reacting it with sodium acetylide in liquid ammonia, followed by an acidic work-up.

See also
 1,6-Dioxecane-2,7-dione
 2-Methyl-2-butanol
 2-Methyl-2-pentanol
 3-Methyl-3-pentanol
 Clocental
 Ethchlorvynol
 Methylpentynol
 Prenderol

References

Alcohols
Muscle relaxants
Ethynyl compounds